The 2013 Kilkenny Intermediate Hurling Championship was the 49th staging of the Kilkenny Intermediate Hurling Championship since its establishment by the Kilkenny County Board in 1929. The Championship began on 14 September 2013 and ended on  20 November 2013.

Rower-Inistioge won their first intermediate title, beating Emeralds 2–13 to 2–11 in the final.

Mooncoin were relegated from the championship following 1–11 to 0–08 defeat to Young Irelands in a replay.

Results

First round

Relegation play-off

Quarter-finals

Semi-finals

Final

References
http://www.kilkennygaa.ie/fixtures?compGroupID=10043&showArchive=Y&season=2013&orderTBCLast=Y

Kilkenny Intermediate Hurling Championship
Kilkenny Intermediate Hurling Championship